"The River" is a song and single by Gibraltarian Flamenco Metal band Breed 77 and it was their first ever single to reach the top 40 — hitting the charts at number 39. It was released as a 2 part CD and DVD set, and on 7" vinyl.

Track 1 written by Paul Isola & Danny Felice. Track 2 (CD1) written by Danny Felice, Paul Isola, Pete Chichone. Track 2 (CD2) written by Pedro Caparros, Paul Isola, Danny Felice.

The line-up for this single consisted of Paul Isola, Danny Felice, Stuart Cavilla, Pete Chichone and Pedro Caparros.

Track listing

 "The River" (Radio Edit)
 "The River" (Album Version)
 "Shadows"
 "La Última Hora" (Unplugged)

Music video

The music video for this single was fully directed by Paul Isola. It was filmed at three different locations along the southern coast of the Iberian Peninsula. These included Río Tinto in Huelva, Tarifa in Cádiz (both in Spain) and finally Europa Point in Gibraltar. Río Tinto is a river which carries blood red waters due to its high mineral content, which provided the video with striking visuals. The famous sand dunes of Tarifa provides the video with a desert-like background, giving it a sense of scorching heat which is felt throughout the video. The Ibrahim-al-Ibrahim Mosque at Europa Point in Gibraltar can be clearly seen in the background as the band is seen playing their music and displaying a flag of Gibraltar as they do on stage at their concerts. This location holds a special meaning to the band as it is a place where they would hang out for hours during their teenage years.

Chart positions
 # 39  (UK Top 40)

Professional reviews
Get Ready to Rock  link

References

Songs about rivers
2004 singles
Breed 77 songs
2004 songs
Albert Productions singles